This is the list of äkıms of Jambyl Region that have held the position since 1992.

List of Äkıms 

 Ömırbek Bäigeldı (12 February 1992 – 6 October 1995)
 Amalbek Tşanov (6 October 1995 – 20 January 1998)
 Sarybai Qalmyrzaev (21 January 1998 – 17 February 1999)
 Serık Ümbetov (17 February 1999 – 14 May 2004)
 Börıbai Jeksembin (14 May 2004 – 30 November 2009)
 Qanat Bozymbaev (30 November 2009 – 20 December 2013)
 Kärım Kökırekbaev (20 December 2013 – 10 January 2018)
 Asqar Myrzahmetov (10 January 2018 – 10 February 2020)
 Berdıbek Saparbaev (10 February 2020 – present)

References 

Government of Kazakhstan